Suzan Jacobien Unia van der Wielen (born October 30, 1971 in Emmen, Drenthe) is a former field hockey player from the Netherlands, who played 191 international matches for the Netherlands, in which the striker scored a total number of seventy goals.

External links
 
 Dutch Hockey Federation

1971 births
Living people
Dutch female field hockey players
Field hockey players at the 1996 Summer Olympics
Field hockey players at the 2000 Summer Olympics
HGC players
Medalists at the 1996 Summer Olympics
Medalists at the 2000 Summer Olympics
Olympic bronze medalists for the Netherlands
Olympic field hockey players of the Netherlands
Olympic medalists in field hockey
Sportspeople from Emmen, Netherlands